Anton Burger (14 November 1824 – 6 July 1905) was a German painter, draftsman and etcher.

Life 
Burger was born in 1824 in the Free City of Frankfurt. He studied at the Städelschule from 1842 to 1846, where his teachers included Johann Jakob Jung, Jakob Becker and Philipp Veit, who suggested that he go to Munich. Burger did so in 1846, but returned after two years. In 1851, he married his childhood sweetheart Katharina Elise Heislitz.

Two years later, he took a study trip to Paris with some friends, where he met Camille Corot and Gustave Courbet. His wife died in 1856 and, in 1858, he moved to Kronberg. The following year, he took a trip to Antwerp and Amsterdam, where he was heavily influenced by the Old Masters. On his return, he married Anna Johanna Auguste Küster, the daughter of Kronberg's most prominent doctor. She died in 1876.

In 1861, he and Jakob Fürchtegott Dielmann (an old friend from his days at the Städelschule) founded the Kronberg Artists' Colony, where he remained until his death. He was highly regarded and came to be known as the "King of Kronberg". In 1882 he married again, this time to a former student, Pauline Fresenius, who was slightly more than thirty years his junior. He was appointed a Royal Prussian Professor in 1894.

He was a prolific and versatile painter, producing works in almost every genre. His paintings sold very well and, in the area around Kronberg, it was considered a sign of good taste to have a "Burger" in one's home.

References

Further reading 
 Manfred Großkinsky: Anton Burger. 1824–1905. Zum 180. Geburtstag. Haus Giersch – Museum Regionaler Kunst, 7. März bis 4. Juli 2004. Henrich, Frankfurt am Main 2004, .
 Museumsgesellschaft Kronberg: Anton Burger. 1824–1905. Maler des alten Frankfurt und Gründer der Kronberger Malerkolonie. (Documents of the Museum Society of Kronberg, Vol. 7). Kramer, Frankfurt am Main 1988, .

External links 

 
 Kronberg Artists' Colony website: Biography and appreciation of Burger
 ArtNet: Paintings (195) by Burger.
 Anton Burger @ J.P.Schneider Galleries

1824 births
1905 deaths
Artists from Frankfurt
19th-century German painters
German male painters
19th-century German male artists